Ck1 or CK1  may refer to:

Transportation
AIDC F-CK-1 Ching-kuo, the Taiwanese fighter jet
the F-16 variant, see F-16 Fighting Falcon variants
Chang Kong CK-1, the radio-controlled target drone
Cicaré CK.1, the Argentine helicopter
the locomotive, see CK class

Biochemistry
Keratin 1
the cytokeratin, see Type II keratin
Casein kinase 1, a family of protein kinases

Asteroids
 1994 CK1, see 10146 Mukaitadashi
 1993 CK1, see 20043 Ellenmacarthur
 1989 CK1, see 4836 Medon
 1986 CK1, see 3951 Zichichi
 1983 CK1, see 4198 Panthera

Other
Crusader Kings I, a grand strategy computer game by Paradox Interactive
the illicit drug cocktail, see cocaine and ketamine
the Calvin Klein product, see Calvin Klein (company)
Pentecost biogeographic region, see Interim Biogeographic Regionalisation for Australia